CZWG Limited is a British architecture practice established in 1975 by Nick Campbell, Roger Zogolovitch, Rex Wilkinson and Piers Gough. The practice's work includes community and public buildings, residential and mixed use projects, student housing and retail, leisure and workplace uses. The practice is known for its work in the postmodern style.

Selected Projects

Community & Public Use 

 Canada Water Library, Southwark, London
 Islington Square, Angel, London
 Maggie’s Centre, Nottingham
 Studio 144, John Hansard Gallery, Southampton
 The Green Bridge, Mile End Park, London
 Westbourne Grove public lavatories, Notting Hill, London

Residential 

 44 Britton Street, Clerkenwell, London which was designed for Janet Street-Porter
 Cascades, Isle of Dogs, London
 China Wharf, Bermondsey, London
 Dundee Wharf, Limehouse, London
 Kidbrooke Village (Ferrier Estate), Greenwich, London
 Hoola, Royal Victoria Docks, London
 Millennium Harbour, Isle of Dogs, London
 Pavilion Square, Woolwich Arsenal, London
 Queen Elizabeth Square, Glasgow
 The Circle, Bermondsey, London
 The Stones, Greatstone-on-Sea
 Vermilion, Rathbone Market, Canning Town, London

Mixed Use 

 Alfred Court, West Hampstead, London
 Aurelia, Rathbone Market, Canning Town, London
 Bankside Lofts, Southwark, London
 Brewery Square, Dorchester
 Fulham Island, Fulham, London
 Oaklands Rise, Old Oak Common, London
 QN7 and Queensland Terrace, Holloway, London
 The Glass Building, Camden, London
 VizioN7, Islington, London
 Waterman’s Place, Leeds

Student 

 Craft Design & Technology (CDT) Building, Bryanston School, Bryanston
 First Way UCFB College and Campus, Wembley, London
 Isledon Road, Finsbury Park, London
 Victoria Hall, Wembley, London

Retail & Leisure 

 Brindleyplace Café, Brindleyplace Central Square, Birmingham
 De Barones Shopping Centre, Breda, The Netherlands
 Islington Square, Angel,  London

Workspace 

 66 Vauxhall, Vauxhall, London
 Aztec West Business Park, Bristol
 Cochrane Square, Glasgow
 Royalty Studios, Notting Hill, London
 St Ann’s Wharf, Newcastle
 Westferry Studios, Limehouse, London

Awards 
2021 New London Architecture Mixing Award for Islington Square

2019 Manser Medal AJ House of the Year Shortlist for The Stones

2012 RIBA Award, Civic Trust Award and Selwyn Goldsmith Award for Universal Design for Canada Water Library

2012 RIBA Award for Maggie’s Centre

2011 London Planning Award for Arsenal Masterplan

2011 RIBA Award, RICS Award and Housing Design Award for Waterman’s Place

2010 RIBA White Rose Award for Waterman’s Place

2010 London Evening Standard Award for Alfred Court

2003 London Evening Standard Award for Fulham Island

2001 RIBA Award for The Green Bridge

1998 Royal Fine Art Commission Building of the Year Award for Brindleyplace Café

1994 Sunday Times Building of the Year Award for Westbourne Grove

1989 Architectural Brickwork Award for Cascades

1989 Civic Trust Award for St Paul’s Mews

1989 Civic Trust Award and RIBA Award for China Wharf

Listed Buildings
Six of the practice's buildings in the postmodern style were listed in 2018: 44 Britton Street, Clerkenwell, London; Aztec West Business Park, Bristol; Cascades, Isle of Dogs, London; CDT Building, Bryanston School; China Wharf, Bermondsey, London; and The Circle, Bermondsey, London.

References

External links 
CZWG website www.czwg.com

Architecture firms based in London
1975 establishments in England